Lodge is a collaborative album by Fanu and Bill Laswell, released on March 28, 2008 by Karlrecords.

Track listing

Personnel 
Adapted from the Lodge liner notes.
Musicians
Fanu – drum programming
Graham Haynes – cornet
Bill Laswell – bass guitar, effects, producer
Nils Petter Molvær – trumpet
Bernie Worrell – keyboards
Technical personnel
John Brown – cover art, design
James Dellatacoma – assistant engineer
Michael Fossenkemper – mastering
Robert Musso – engineering

Release history

References

External links 
 Lodge at Bandcamp
 

2008 albums
Collaborative albums
Bill Laswell albums
Albums produced by Bill Laswell